
 
 

Mylor Conservation Park is a protected area located in the Australian state of South Australia in the suburb of Mylor in the Adelaide Hills state government region about  south-east of the state capital of Adelaide and about  north-east of the town of Mylor.

The conservation park consists of land in Allotment 51 of Deposited Plan 46510 and Section 3322 in the cadastral unit of the Hundred of Noarlunga. It is located within land east of Strathalbyn Road and west of the watercourse of the Onkaparinga River, and is accessed via Whitehead Road. Part of the land was previously used as a recreational facility called the Mylor Recreation Centre.

The Heysen Trail, the long distance walking trail, passes through the conservation park entering from the west via Whitehead Road and exiting in the north onto Hooper Road.

The conservation park came into existence on 27 February 1997 by proclamation under the National Parks and Wildlife Act 1972 which also ensured the continuation of “existing rights of entry, prospecting, exploration or mining” provided by the Mining Act 1971.

Vegetation in the southern part of the conservation park was surveyed in 2000 and subsequently described as consisting of an open forest of Eucalyptus baxteri and Eucalyptus obliqua over an understorey of Lepidosperma semiteres, Hakea carinata, Platylobium obtusangulum, Hakea rostrate, and Daviesia leptophylla.

The conservation park is classified as an IUCN Category III protected area.

See also
Protected areas of South Australia

References

External links
Mylor Conservation Park official webpage
Mylor Conservation Park webpage on the Protected Planet website
Friends of Mylor webpage
Mylor Conservation Park webpage on the BirdsSA website

Conservation parks of South Australia
Protected areas established in 1997
1997 establishments in Australia
Adelaide Hills